The Small Passion is a series of 36 woodcuts and a frontispiece by Albrecht Dürer. One of the best surviving sets is now in the British Museum in London. It was produced in 1511 as a new set of works on Biblical themes and the life and Passion of Christ (its title distinguishes it from his earlier Great Passion) in 1511, the same year as he republished earlier works such as Apocalypse.

List

Frontispiece 
Fall of Man
Adam and Eve Expelled from Paradise
Annunciation
Nativity of Jesus
Christ Bids Farewell to his Mother
Christ Enters Jerusalem
Christ Drives the Merchants from the Temple
Last Supper
Christ Washes the Disciples' Feet
Agony in the Garden
Christ Arrested
Christ Before Ananias
Christ Before Caiphas
Christ Mocked
Christ Before Pilate
Christ Before Herod
Flagellation
Christ Crowned with Thorns
Ecce homo
Pilate Washes his Hands
Christ Carries his Cross
Veronica and the Sudarium
Christ Nailed to the Cross
Crucifixion
Christ Descends into Limbo
Christ Taken Down from the Cross
Lamentation
Burial of Christ
Resurrection of Christ
Christ Appears to his Mother
Noli me tangere
Supper at Emmaus
Incredulity of Saint Thomas
Ascension
Pentecost
Last Judgement

Gallery

Bibliography
  Costantino Porcu (ed.), Dürer, Rizzoli, Milano 2004.

1511 works
Prints and drawings in the British Museum
Prints by Albrecht Dürer
Woodcuts
Prints depicting the Passion of Jesus
Catholic engraving